In Greek mythology, Palaechthon or Palaichthon (Ancient Greek: Παλαίχθονος Palaikhthon means "ancient earth") was the son of Gaea (Earth) and the father of Pelasgus, king of Argos, who gave his name to the race of the Pelasgoi (Pelasgians). He may also be a king of Argos when taking into account the sovereignty of his son.

Mythology 
Palaeachthon was only mentioned by Aeschylus in The Suppliants in the following account:

  For I am Pelasgus, offspring of Palaechthon, whom the earth brought forth, and lord of this land; and after me, their king, is rightly named the race of the Pelasgi, who harvest the land. Interpretation 
The earthborn Palaichthon (‘long in the land’, i.e. ‘indigenous inhabitant’), whose name appears in no other source, seems to have been an arbitrarily invented figure.

 Note 

 References 
 Aeschylus, translated in two volumes. 2. Suppliant Women'' by Herbert Weir Smyth, Ph. D. Cambridge, MA. Harvard University Press. 1926. Online version at the Perseus Digital Library. Greek text available from the same website.

Children of Gaia